Fahad Ensour was Jordan's Secretary of State for Legal Affairs.
 
He was born in Jordan in 1934. He obtained his law degree from the Syrian University/Damascus in 1959. Nsour served as attorney general and a judge in various courts.  Between 1972–1974 to 1978 he worked as a legal adviser at the Cabinet. He chaired the Supreme Court of Jordan from 1988 to 1997.

In 2012, Ensour has been appointed as a Constitutional Court Justice in the Constitutional Court, which is considered the highest judicial body in Jordan.

References

1934 births
Living people
Jordanian judges
Damascus University alumni
Government ministers of Jordan
State ministers of Jordan